Três Coroas is a  municipality in Brazil, located in the state of Rio Grande do Sul. Its population is estimated at 28,581 (2020).

References

Municipalities in Rio Grande do Sul